The Sonata for two clarinets (Sonate pour deux clarinettes), FP 7, is a piece of chamber music composed by Francis Poulenc in 1918. Dedicated to Édouard Souberbielle, its total execution time is about six minutes.  It is unusual among clarinet duets in that it is written for B clarinet, which generally plays the melodic themes, and A clarinet, which plays a more supporting role through much of the piece. It is also unusual for music of this period that the clarinetists perform different time signatures simultaneously in parts of the opening movement.

Genesis 
On 17 January 1918, Poulenc was mobilized despite the imminent end of the first world war. Based in Vincennes, he did not lose contact with the Paris of the arts and serenely led the beginnings of his career as a composer.

After he met some success with the Rapsodie nègre and worldwide fame after the premiere of the Trois mouvements perpétuels played by pianist Ricardo Viñes, Poulenc began writing two pieces in the spring of 1918. Published the same year, the sonata for piano, four hands, and the sonata for two clarinets were created during the same concerts at the Salle Huyghens in Paris on 5 April 1919.

Reception and legacy 
The success of the Trois mouvements perpétuels was confirmed by the sonata for two clarinets. The biographer Henri Hell recognized "an acid taste that delightfully annoys the ear".

Style 
Praised for the solidity of its writing, the sonata already testified to a mastery of the technique of wind instruments dear to the composer. This inclination for the winds coincided with that of Igor Stravinsky who clearly rejected the use of strings for their too strong resemblance to the human voice.

Structure 
Like most of the composer's chamber music pieces, with the exception of the Cello Sonata, the sonata for two clarinets has three short movements:

 Presto
 Andante
 Vif

Recordings 
  Michel Portal and Paul Meyer: Francis Poulenc – Intégrale Musique de chambre – RCA Red Seal

Published score 
 Sonata for two clarinets, Chester Music, London, cat. CH00219

References 

Sources

Further reading

External links 
 
 Francis Poulenc – Sonata for 2 Clarinets on YouTube
 Sonate pour deux clarinettes on Philharmonie de Paris
 Sonate pour deux clarinettes on Hyperion Records
 Clarinettes (2). FP 7 on data.bnf.fr
 

Compositions by Francis Poulenc
Poulenc Francis, Sonata for two clarinets
1918 compositions